Pucaraju (possibly from Quechua puka red, rahu snow, ice, mountain with snow, "red snow-covered mountain") is a mountain in the Cordillera Blanca in the Andes of Peru, about  high or  high depending on the source. It is situated in the Ancash Region, Recuay Province, Ticapampa District. Pucaraju lies west of Yanamarey and northeast of Lake Querococha.

The IGN-Peru map, cites the main peak as Tunsho, while applying the name Pucarajo to the southern slopes.

Sources 

Mountains of Peru
Mountains of Ancash Region